Nolan David Fontana (born June 6, 1991) is an American former professional baseball infielder. He has  played for the Los Angeles Angels of Major League Baseball (MLB). Before he began his professional career, he attended the University of Florida, and played college baseball for the Florida Gators.

Early life
Fontana was born in Richardson, Texas, but was raised in Winter Garden, Florida. He played Little League Baseball in Pine Hills, Florida. As a nine-year-old playing in the 12-and-under division, he did not strikeout once until the final game of the year.

Fontana attended West Orange High School in Winter Garden. In 2008, he played in a regional final despite having mononucleosis.

Amateur career
Fontana enrolled at the University of Florida, where he played for the Florida Gators baseball team in the Southeastern Conference (SEC) of the National Collegiate Athletic Association's Division I. As a freshman, he had a .287 batting average, and committed only four errors. He won a Gold Glove Award for his defensive play, and was named a Freshman All-American. Fontana played for the United States national collegiate baseball team in the summer of 2010. Fontana and Gators teammate Brian Johnson were the only two freshmen on the team.

In 2011, Fontana was a semifinalist for the Brooks Wallace Award as the nation's top shortstop. He had a .289 batting average for the Gators, who were the runners-up in the 2011 College World Series (CWS). He was named to the SEC Tournament's All-Tournament team, and to the SEC All-Defensive team for his second consecutive year. Fontana was named a preseason All-American before the 2012 season. In his junior year at Florida, he compiled a .284 batting average, a .406 on-base percentage, nine home runs, ten doubles, and 30 runs batted in, as the Gators reached the 2012 CWS.

Professional career

Houston Astros

The Houston Astros selected Fontana in the second round, with the 61st overall selection, of the 2012 MLB Draft. He received a $875,000 signing bonus from the Astros, and reported to the Lexington Legends of the Class A South Atlantic League. He reached base six times in his professional debut. Though he only batted .225, he drew 65 walks in 49 games played, leading to a .464 on-base percentage.

In 2013, the Astros invited him to spring training. He spent the 2013 season with the Lancaster JetHawks of the Class A-Advanced California League, where he had more walks (102) than strikeouts (100) in 104 games played. After the season, he played in the Arizona Fall League. He opened the 2014 season with the Corpus Christi Hooks of the Class AA Texas League.

The Astros again invited Fontana to spring training in 2015. He played for the Fresno Grizzlies of the Class AAA Pacific Coast League (PCL) in 2015. After the 2015 season, the Astros added Fontana to their 40-man roster, protecting him from being eligible in the Rule 5 draft. In 2016, Fontana was hitting .195 through 73 games for Fresno. On July 14, he was demoted to Corpus Christi.

Los Angeles Angels
On November 22, 2016, Fontana was claimed off waivers by the Los Angeles Angels of Anaheim. He began the 2017 season with the Salt Lake Bees of the PCL, and was promoted to the major leagues on May 22. He recorded his first major league hit, a home run, on May 26. He was released by the organization on September 4, 2018.

Texas Rangers
On December 19, 2018, Fontana signed a minor league deal with the Texas Rangers. He was assigned to the Triple-A Nashville Sounds to open the 2019 season. He was released on June 25, 2019.

Personal life
Fontana is the grandson of Lew Burdette, who was a Major League Baseball pitcher and All-Star. Burdette lived with the Fontana family for the final years of his life.

Fontana's parents, who are fans of the Texas Rangers, named their son after Nolan Ryan.

Nolan married in 2020 to wife Kacey Fontana.

References

External links

1991 births
Living people
People from Richardson, Texas
People from Winter Garden, Florida
Sportspeople from Orange County, Florida
Baseball players from Texas
Baseball players from Florida
Major League Baseball infielders
Los Angeles Angels players
Florida Gators baseball players
Lexington Legends players
Lancaster JetHawks players
Corpus Christi Hooks players
Peoria Javelinas players
Fresno Grizzlies players
Salt Lake Bees players
Nashville Sounds players